Kutum is a district of North Darfur state, Sudan.

References

Districts of Sudan